Apollonius of Alexandria may refer to:

Apollonius of Alexandria, winner of the Stadion race of the 218th Olympiad in AD 93
Apollonius of Alexandria, philosopher cited by Simplicius, possibly identical to the philosopher Allīnūs